Valbo FF is a Swedish football club located in Valbo.

Background
Valbo FF currently plays in Division 4 Gästrikland. |Swedish football]]. They play their home matches at the Åbyvallen in Valbo.

The club is affiliated to Gestriklands Fotbollförbund. Valbo FF have competed in the Svenska Cupen on 18 occasions and have played 44 matches in the competition.

Season to season

In their most successful period Valbo FF competed in the following divisions:

In recent seasons Valbo FF have competed in the following divisions:

Footnotes

External links
Official website

 
Sport in Gävleborg County
Association football clubs established in 1980
1980 establishments in Sweden